The Bank of Nolensville is a two-story brick building in Nolensville, Tennessee, United States, that was listed on the National Register of Historic Places in 1988.  The bank that it once housed was opened in 1906 and operated until October 1932, when it was forced to close during the Great Depression.

Sherwood G. Jenkins (1843-1915) was a promoter of the Bank of Nolensville and was president at his death in 1915.

References

Bank buildings on the National Register of Historic Places in Tennessee
Buildings and structures in Williamson County, Tennessee
Commercial buildings completed in 1906
National Register of Historic Places in Williamson County, Tennessee
1906 establishments in Tennessee